Tangyin County is a county in the north of Henan province, China. It is under the administration of Anyang City.

Administrative divisions
As 2012, this county is divided to 5 towns and 5 townships.
Towns

Townships

Climate

References

County-level divisions of Henan